thermo plastic is the 4th album by the Japanese singer Hitomi, released on the Avex Trax label on the 13th of October, 1999.

The tracks "Wish", "Kimi no Tonari", "Taion" and "There is..." were released as singles. 
The album reached #2 on the weekly Oricon charts and charted for nine weeks, selling 316,250 copies. It's the 75th best-selling album of the year 1999 in Japan.

It is her first album that is not produced by Tetsuya Komuro.

Track listing

External links
Oricon.co.jp
http://metropolis.co.jp/biginjapan/373/biginjapaninc.htm

References

1999 albums
Hitomi albums
Avex Trax albums
Dance-pop albums by Japanese artists